DHP1, meaning Diesel Hydraulic Prototype number 1, was a prototype Type 3 mainline diesel locomotive built between 1962 and 1963 by Clayton to demonstrate their wares to British Railways. It was designed for mixed traffic work, being equipped with steam heating facilities for working passenger trains. It was painted red, with the cab area above bonnet-level height painted cream.

Visually similar to their Class 17 Type 1 product, though longer, and with the radiator grilles in the ends of the engine covers rather than the sides. The locomotive saw little service, mainly around the International Combustion works in Derby. The locomotive was broken up by Clayton's in April 1967.

External links 
 Photo in International Combustion works in 1964

DHP1
B-B locomotives
Railway locomotives introduced in 1965
Scrapped locomotives
DHP1
Standard gauge locomotives of Great Britain